Tripunithura railway station is a (NSG 5 Category) railway terminal located at Tripunithura, Kochi, in the Indian state of Kerala. The 
station is on the rail route between Thiruvananthapuram Central and Ernakulam Junction via .

History
During the construction of the first railway line in Kerala the king of the royal kingdom of Kochi sold 14 golden caparisons of elephants of Poornathrayeesha temple at Tripunithura to finance the track between Ernakulam and Shoranur.

Layout
Tripunithara railway station has two platforms for handling long distance and passenger trains.

Significance
Prominent industries like FACT, Kochi Refineries, Hindustan Organics and Chemicals Ltd, Carbon Black Industries Ltd etc. are in close proximity to the Tripunithura railway station. The information technology park InfoPark, Kochi, is situated at a distance of 9.5 km from Tripunithura railway station. Tripunithura and Aluva is the entry point for travelers from Idukki district, which is not connected to a rail network. It is also the nearest station for people going to Muvattupuzha, Kolenchery, Puthencruz, Thiruvankulam, Maradu, Kundannur and Chottanikkara Temple.

Services

SuperFast/Express trains

Passenger trains

See also

Ernakulam Town
Seaport-Airport Road
Transport in Kochi
Aluva railway station
Cochin Harbour Terminus

References

Railway stations in Kochi
Thiruvananthapuram railway division